The 1944 Minnesota Golden Gophers football team represented the University of Minnesota in the 1944 Big Ten Conference football season. In their third year under head coach George Hauser, the Golden Gophers compiled a 5–3–1 record but were outscored by their opponents by a combined total of 225 to 162.

No players were awarded any major awards, All-American status or All-Big Ten status. Back John Lundquist was awarded the Team MVP Award.

Total attendance for the season was 179,979, which averaged to 29,997. The season high for attendance was against Northwestern.

Schedule

Game summaries

Michigan

On October 7, 1944, Minnesota lost to Michigan by a 28 to 13 score at Memorial Stadium in Minneapolis. The outcome was the first victory by a Michigan team playing on the road against Minnesota since 1932. Michigan fullback Bob Wiese scored three touchdowns. Bill Culligan scored Michigan's first touchdown, and Joe Ponsetto kicked all four points after touchdown. In the first quarter, Michigan stopped two Minnesota drives inside the Michigan 10-yard line. Michigan gained all of its yards from scrimmage on the ground, attempting only one pass, and finishing the game with 265 net rushing yards. Minnesota gained 119 yards rushing and 81 passing yards.

References

Minnesota
Minnesota Golden Gophers football seasons
Minnesota Golden Gophers football